This is a list of villages in Madhubani district of Bihar state, India.

A–C 

 Bardaha
 Aunsi
 Bardepur
 Baruar
 Basuki Bihari
 Bhoj Pandaul
 Bichkhana
 Bijlipur
 Bistaul 
 Champa

D–L 

 Damla
 Dhanga
 Gangdwar
 Imadpatti
 Jamsam
 Jamuthari
 Kaluahi
 Kapsiya
 Lakhnaur
 Laukaha
 Lohna

M–N 

 Mahrail
 Maibi
 Malmal
 Mangrauni
 Mehath
 Mohanpur
 Mohna
 Nabtol
 Nagdah Balain
 Nahari
 Naruar
 Navani 
 Navtol

P–U 

 Parjuar Dih
 Rajaur
 Rampatti
 Ranipur
 Sarisav Pahi
 Saurath Sabha
 Shibipatti
 Siriyapur
 Sonmati
 Sudai
 Uchhaith
 Chhotaki sangi

References 

 
Madhubani